The Landfall Essay Competition is an annual competition open to New Zealand writers. It is judged by the current editor of the long-running literary magazine Landfall and the winning entry is published in a subsequent issue of the magazine.

History 
The Landfall Essay Competition was first held in 1997 on the occasion of the 50th anniversary of the literary magazine Landfall. It was begun by Chris Price, who was editor at the time, and was sponsored by the Otago University Press. The competition has been awarded annually since 2009 and is judged each year by the current editor. 

The aim of the competition is "to encourage New Zealand writers to think aloud about New Zealand culture" and "to revive and sustain the tradition of vivid, contentious and creative essay writing".

In 2017 the Charles Brasch Young Writers' Essay Competition, named for Landfall founder Charles Brasch, was launched, which is an annual award open to young writers between the ages of 16 and 21.

In 2019, Strong Words 2019: The Best of the Landfall Essay Competition was published, featuring shortlisted competition entries selected by Emma Neale, then editor of Landfall. It was selected by The Spinoff as one of the ten best non-fiction works of 2019.

Eligibility and conditions 
 there are a number of conditions of entry, including:
 The competition is open to New Zealand citizens or permanent residents.
 Essays must not exceed 4000 words.
 Essays can be on any topic but must not have been previously published.

The winner is announced and published in each November issue of Landfall. The winner receives $3000 and a year’s subscription to Landfall.

List of winners by year 
1997: Gregory O'Brien and Joris de Bres.
1999: C. K. Stead and Peter Wells.
2002: Patrick Evans and Kapka Kassabova.
2004: Martin Edmond and Tze Ming Mok.
2006: Anna Sanderson.
2008: Alice Miller and Kirsten Warner.
2009: Ashleigh Young. 
2010: Ian Wedde.
2011: Philip Armstrong. Runner-up: Siobhan Harvey. Commended: Ruth Nichol, Raewyn Alexander, and Natalie Kershaw.
2012: Elizabeth Smither. Runners-up: Majella Cullinane and Jane Williamson.
2013: Tim Corballis. Runners-up: Eva Ng and Maggie Rainey-Smith.
2014: Diana Bridge. Runners-up: Sarah Bainbridge, Simon Thomas, and Scott Hamilton.
2015: Tracey Slaughter. 2nd: Phil Braithwaite. 3rd: Louise Wallace. Highly commended: Therese Lloyd. 
2016: Airini Beautrais. 2nd: Michalia Arathimos. 3rd: Carolyn Cossey. 
2017: Joint first: Laurence Fearnley and Alie Benge. Shortlisted: Ingrid Horrocks, Lynley Edmeades, Sue Wootton, Kate Camp, and Mark Houlahan.   
2018: Alice Miller. 2nd: Susan Wardell. 3rd: Sam Keenan.
2019: Joint first: Tobias Buck and Nina Mingya Powles. 3rd: Sarah Harpur. Joint 4th: Joan Fleming and Jillian Sullivan. Highly commended: Ingrid Horrocks, Himali McInnes, and Derek Schulz. Commended: Justine Jungersen-Smith and Amy Brown.
2020: A.M. McKinnon. 2nd: Tan Tuck Ming. 3rd equal: Anna Blair and Siobhan Harvey. Highly commended: Sarah Barnett, Shelley Burne-Field, Anna Knox, Una Cruickshank.
2021: Andrew Dean. 2nd: Claire Mabey. 3rd: Susan Wardell. Highly commended: Norman Franke, Susanna Elliffe.

See also 

 List of New Zealand literary awards

External links 

 Landfall magazine

References 

New Zealand non-fiction literary awards
1997 establishments in New Zealand
Awards established in 1997